Heinrich Hartard of Rolligen (born 1633 in Ansembourg) was a German clergyman and bishop for the Roman Catholic Diocese of Mainz. He was ordained in 1658. He was appointed bishop of the diocese in 1711. He died in 1719.

References 

1633 births
1719 deaths
German Roman Catholic bishops